Moa Högdahl (born 14 March 1996) is a Norwegian handball player for Viborg HK and the Norwegian national team.

She also represented Norway at the 2016 Women's Junior World Handball Championship, placing 5th, at the 2015 Women's Under-19 European Handball Championship, placing 6th and at the 2013 Youth European Championship, placing 7th.

She is the daughter of former international handballer, Mia Hermansson-Högdahl.

References

External links

1996 births
Living people
Sportspeople from Trondheim
Norwegian female handball players
Expatriate handball players
Norwegian expatriate sportspeople in Denmark
Viborg HK players
21st-century Norwegian women